Pennsylvania State Senate District 12 includes part of Montgomery County. It is currently represented by Democrat Maria Collett.

District profile
The district includes the following areas:

 Ambler
 Bryn Athyn
 Franconia Township
 Hatboro
 Hatfield
 Hatfield Township
 Horsham Township
 Lansdale
 Lower Gwynedd Township
 Lower Moreland Township
 Montgomery Township
 Plymouth Township
 Salford Township
 Souderton
 Telford (Montgomery County portion)
 Upper Dublin Township
 Upper Moreland Township
 Whitpain Township
 Worcester Township

Senators

Recent election results

References

Pennsylvania Senate districts
Government of Bucks County, Pennsylvania
Government of Montgomery County, Pennsylvania